The Torbay Inn is a historic public house in the town of Paignton, Devon. It is the town's oldest public house, dating to the early 17th century. It has been a Grade II listed building since 1975.

References 

Buildings and structures in Paignton
Grade II listed pubs in Devon